Georg Zacharias (14 June 1884 – 31 July 1953) was a German backstroke and breaststroke swimmer who competed in the 1904 Summer Olympics. He was born and died in Berlin. In the 1904 Olympics he won a gold medal in the 440 yard breaststroke and a bronze medal in the 100 yard backstroke.

References

External links
profile

1884 births
1953 deaths
Swimmers from Berlin
German male swimmers
Olympic gold medalists for Germany
Olympic bronze medalists for Germany
Olympic swimmers of Germany
Swimmers at the 1904 Summer Olympics
Olympic bronze medalists in swimming
Medalists at the 1904 Summer Olympics
Olympic gold medalists in swimming
19th-century German people
20th-century German people